Chiliochoria is a former municipality in Messenia, Peloponnese, Greece. Since the 2011 local government reform it is part of the municipality Pylos-Nestoras, of which it is a municipal unit. The municipal unit has an area of 73.950 km2. Its population in 2011 was 2,468. The seat of the municipality was in Chandrinos.

References

Populated places in Messenia